Broadway Bill is a 1918 American silent romantic drama film directed by Fred J. Balshofer and starring Harold Lockwood, May Allison, Pomeroy Cannon, Lester Cuneo, and Fred L. Wilson. The film was released by Metro Pictures on February 11, 1918.

Plot

Cast
Harold Lockwood as 'Broadway Bill' Clayton
Martha Mansfield as Muriel Latham
Cornish Beck as Jack Latham
Raymond Hadley as Godfrey St. Cleve (as Raymond C. Hadley)
Stanton Heck as Buck Hardigan
Bert Starkey as Creed
William Black as John Underwood (as W.W. Black)
Tom Blake as 'Irish' Fallon
William Clifford as Daddy Dunningan
Artie Ortego as Wabishke (as Art Ortego)

Preservation
The film is now considered lost.

References

External links

1918 romantic drama films
American romantic drama films
1918 films
American silent feature films
American black-and-white films
Metro Pictures films
Lost American films
Films directed by Fred J. Balshofer
1910s American films
Silent romantic drama films
Silent American drama films